Malur Ramasamy Srinivasan (born 5 January 1930), is an Indian nuclear scientist and mechanical engineer. He played a key role in the development of India's nuclear power programme and the development of the PHWR. He received the Padma Vibhushan Award.

Early life and education
The third of eight siblings, Srinivasan was born in 1930 in Bangalore. He completed his schooling at the Intermediate College, Mysore in the science stream where he chose Sanskrit and English as his language for study. Despite physics being his first love, he joined the newly started engineering college (currently UVCE) by M. Visvesvaraya, where he obtained a bachelor's degree in Mechanical Engineering  in 1950. He subsequently completed his masters in 1952 and was awarded a doctor of Philosophy degree in 1954 from McGill University, Montreal, Canada. His field of specialization was gas turbine technology.

Career
Srinivasan joined the Department of Atomic Energy in September 1955. He worked with Homi Bhabha on the construction of India's first nuclear research reactor, Apsara, which went critical in August 1956. In August 1959, Srinivasan was appointed as Principal Project Engineer in the construction of India's first atomic power station. Following this, in 1967, Srinivasan was appointed as Chief Project Engineer at the Madras Atomic Power Station.

In 1974, Srinivasan was appointed Director, Power Projects Engineering Division, DAE and then Chairman, Nuclear Power Board, DAE in 1984. In these capacities, he was responsible for planning, execution, and operation, of all nuclear power projects in the country. In 1987, he was appointed Chairman, Atomic Energy Commission and Secretary, Department of Atomic Energy, with responsibility for all aspects of the Indian Nuclear Program. The Nuclear Power Corporation of India was created in September 1987, with Srinivasan as the Founder-Chairman. He has been responsible for a total of 18 nuclear power units, of which seven are in operation, another seven under construction, and four still in the planning stages.

Other responsibilities
Srinivasan was a senior advisor at the International Atomic Energy Agency, Vienna from 1990 to 1992. He was a Member of the Planning Commission, Government of India from 1996 to 1998, looking after the portfolios of Energy, and Science & Technology. He was a Member of India's National Security Advisory Board from 2002 to 2004 and again from 2006 to 2008. He was also Chairman, Task Force on Higher Education, Karnataka from 2002 to 2004. Srinivasan is Founder Member of World Association of Nuclear Operators (WANO); Fellow, Indian National Academy of Engineering and Institution of Engineers (India) and Emeritus Fellow of Indian Nuclear Society.

Awards and honours
Kannada Rajyotsava award, 2017.
Padma Vibhushan in 2015
Padma Bhushan in 1990.
Padma Shri in 1984
Diamond Jubilee Award of the Central Board of Irrigation and Power.
Best Designer Award of the Institution of Engineers (India).
Sanjay Gandhi Award for Science & Technology
Om Prakash Bhasin Award for Science & Technology
Homi Bhabha Gold Medal from the Indian Science Congress
Distinguished Alumnus Award by Vishveshwaraya College of Engineering, Bangalore
Homi Bhabha Life Time Award of Indian Nuclear Society.

References

External links
 http://www.asset.org.in/Archtechts%20of%20Indian%20Nuclear%20Programme.pdf
 http://dae.nic.in/?q=node/394
 Srinivas Laxman: Dr. M.R.Srinivasan, Former Indian Atomic Chief, Discusses India’s Nuclear Future, August 29, 2011, AsianScientist, (archive.org)
 http://www.dianuke.org/understand-liability-srinivasan/
 http://www.business-standard.com/article/opinion/m-r-srinivasan-why-kudankulam-nuke-plant-is-viable-111100900019_1.html
 http://news.oneindia.in/2012/02/02/clear-the-air-on-action-against-scientists-srinivasan.html
 https://web.archive.org/web/20130307232409/http://www.nuclearfriendsfoundation.com/nuclear-experts.aspx
 http://www.gauravblog.com/?p=1139

1930 births
Living people
Indian nuclear physicists
Indian mechanical engineers
Recipients of the Padma Bhushan in science & engineering
Nuclear history of India
Members of the Planning Commission of India
Recipients of the Padma Vibhushan in science & engineering
Engineers from Karnataka
Scientists from Bangalore
McGill University Faculty of Engineering alumni
University of Mysore alumni
Recipients of the Padma Shri in science & engineering
20th-century Indian physicists
20th-century Indian engineers
Indian nuclear engineers